The Borough of Islwyn was one of five local government districts of Gwent from 1974 to 1996.

History
The borough was formed in 1974 as a local government district of Gwent. It covered the whole area of three former districts and part of a fourth, which were all abolished at the same time:
Abercarn Urban District
Bedwellty Urban District - the Argoed, Blackwood, Cefn Fforest, and Pengam wards only (rest became New Tredegar community in Rhymney Valley)
Mynyddislwyn Urban District
Risca Urban District
All the constituent parts of Islwyn had previously been in the administrative county of Monmouthshire prior to the reforms. Gwent County Council provided county-level services to the new borough.

The district's name (meaning "below the grove") was derived from the ancient parish of Mynyddislwyn which covered its area. This was shown in the borough's coat of arms which represented a mountain below a grove of oak trees. Islwyn was also the pen name of local poet William Thomas (1832–1878). 

The borough was abolished in 1996, when its area became part of Caerphilly County Borough.

Islwyn continues as a Westminster constituency and a Senedd constituency. The Westminster constituency's best-known MP was Neil Kinnock.

Political control
The first election to the council was held in 1973, initially operating as a shadow authority before coming into its powers on 1 April 1974. Political control of the council from 1974 until its abolition in 1996 was held by the following parties:

Premises

The council built itself a new headquarters in 1977 at Pontllanfraith House on Blackwood Road in Pontllanfraith. The building subsequently served as offices for Caerphilly County Borough Council until 2015 and has since been demolished.

References

Gwent (county)
Districts of Wales abolished in 1996
1974 establishments in Wales